Pablo Arnaud Carreño (born 8 January 1947) is a Mexican politician from the Institutional Revolutionary Party. From 2000 to 2003 he served as Deputy of the LVIII Legislature of the Mexican Congress representing Oaxaca. He also served as Mayor of Oaxaca de Juárez from 1995 to 1998.

References

1947 births
Living people
People from Oaxaca City
Municipal presidents in Oaxaca
National Action Party (Mexico) politicians
Institutional Revolutionary Party politicians
21st-century Mexican politicians
Politicians from Oaxaca
Benito Juárez Autonomous University of Oaxaca alumni
20th-century Mexican politicians
Deputies of the LVIII Legislature of Mexico
Members of the Chamber of Deputies (Mexico) for Oaxaca